= Jardim do Salso =

Brazilian neighborhood

Coordinates: 30°03′S 51°10′W

Jardim do Salso (meaning Willow Garden in Portuguese) is a neighbourhood (bairro) in the city of Porto Alegre, the state capital of Rio Grande do Sul, in Brazil. It was created by Law 6594 from January 31, 1990. Jardim do Salso is a residential neighbourhood.
